Sally Olsen (10 April 1912 – 12 April 2006) was a Norwegian-born American social worker and missionary.  She was a pioneer of evangelical and social work for criminals and for orphans and neglected children in San Juan, Puerto Rico,

Sally Olsen was born in Bergen, Norway. She was the eldest of four girls. Her father died when she was five years old. In 1929, at age seventeen,  Olsen and her family moved to the United States, where they first settled in Brooklyn, New York. Olsen attended the Bible school of  Philadelphia Church  in the Andersonville neighborhood of Chicago where she trained for the ministry and was ordained a minister.

Olsen was a pioneer in social work for criminals in San Juan, Puerto Rico. In 1952, she founded Sarons Rose, a day center mission for children with one or both parents in prison. She also served unofficially in the role of an unofficial prison chaplain in San Juan where she was nicknamed the Angel of Prisoners (El Angel de los Presos).
Her life was chronicled by Max Manus in 1975 and by E. Mentzen in 1987.

References

Further reading
Mentzen, Av Egil (1987) Men Gud Ga Vekst: Jubileumsboken om Sarons Rose Sally Olsen - fangenes engel pa Puerto Rico (Baksidebilde) 
Manus, Max (1975) Sally Olsen : Fangenes engel i Puerto Rico (Oslo: Luther Forlag)

1912 births
2006 deaths
People from San Juan, Puerto Rico
American Pentecostal pastors
American Pentecostal missionaries
Female Christian missionaries
American social workers
Norwegian emigrants to the United States
Norwegian Pentecostal missionaries
Protestant missionaries in Puerto Rico
20th-century American clergy